Sun Direct is an Indian Satellite television service provider. Sun Direct was launched in December 2007. It transmits digital satellite television and audio to households in India. Sun Direct uses MPEG-4 digital compression, transmitting HD Channels on GSAT-15 at 93.5°E and SD Channels on MEASAT-3 at 91.5°E. Sun Direct currently offers total 465 channels and services, along with many other active services. It is the first service provider to launch HD Counterpart.

History 
Sun Direct is a joint venture between the Astro Group of Malaysia and the SUN Group of India. Sun Group entered into an MoU with the Astro group on 27 January 1997, when Aircel was not in existence, but since the government of India did not allow the use of KU band transponders for DTH services the project was put on hold, the firm said in a statement. After the DTH policy was announced by the government in December 2007, Astro picked up a 20% stake in Sun Direct TV. The stake was valued at approximately $115 million. Sun Direct TV was registered on 16 February 2005. However, the failed launch of Sun Direct INSAT 4C resulted in Sun Direct lack of transponders, delaying the launch. The service was finally launched on 18 Jan 2008, after availability of transponders from Indian National Satelite System.

Sun Direct spread rapidly all over the country owing to the lowest pricing of any DTH services in India. In December 2009, Sun Direct was launched in Mumbai, the country's financial capital, and announced its pan- India launch. By 2009 it became the leading DTH provider with 3 million subscribers. This makes it the second largest DTH service provider of India. In April 2010 Sun Direct became the No.1 DTH service provider of India with 5.8 million subscribers and soon launched its HD service in India.

INSAT-4B glitch and satellite change 
On 7 July 2010 a power glitch in the Indian National Satellite System satellite turned down the DTH system partly and SUN Direct announced that the service would be free till all the services are restored. The partial service was restored on Indian National Satelite System Sun Direct with 193 channels and meantime SUN Direct is now transmitting 173 channels on MEASAT-3 for uninterrupted transition of Sun Direct customers from Indian National Satellite System at 93.5°E. to MEASAT-3 at 91.5°E. Sun direct now uses 4 MEASAT-3 Transponders (TP's) and 3 INSAT-4B TP's to provide DTH services, and additionally through exclusive agreement with BIG TV, a DTH arm of Reliance ADAG group, Sun Direct Shares 2 TP's of BigTV (BIG TV holds 12 TP's in MEASAT-3), i.e. BIG TV allows Sun Direct to get signals of FTA channels to Sun Direct. Sun Direct stopped its Standard Definition Sun Direct TV services from INSAT-4B and moved its High Definition TV Services to INSAT-4B, Sun Direct now broadcasts its entire Standard Definition TV from MEASAT-3.

As of 2017, Sun Direct uses eight transponders equally split between MEASAT-3 and GSAT-15 with three being added the year itself. HD channels are being beamed from the four transponders on GSAT-15.

2021 power glitch 
On 21 June 2021, several transponders of MEASAT-3 went off due to dead solar panels. This resulted in over 150 channels on Sun Direct going off air, which prompted the company to shift many of the important channels to other transponders. All the channels resumed within a day as alternative transponders were provided by MEASAT Satellite System.

Subscriber base and market share 
As of September 2021, Sun Direct is the fourth largest satellite television provider in India with a subscriber base of approximately 12.34 million and a market share of 17.91%.

See also
 DD Free Dish
 Airtel digital TV
 Dish TV
 Sun TV Network
 TATA Sky
 D2h
 Zing Digital
 Reliance Digital TV

References

External links
 Official website

 

High-definition television
Direct broadcast satellite services
Television networks in India
Indian brands
Companies based in Chennai
Telecommunications companies established in 2007
Mass media companies established in 2007
Sun Group
Indian companies established in 2007
2007 establishments in Tamil Nadu